Valentin Raychev (born 20 September 1958) is a retired welterweight freestyle wrestler from Bulgaria. He won an Olympics gold medal in 1980 and silver medals at the world and European championships in 1981.

References 

1958 births
Living people
Olympic wrestlers of Bulgaria
Wrestlers at the 1980 Summer Olympics
Bulgarian male sport wrestlers
Olympic gold medalists for Bulgaria
Olympic medalists in wrestling
Medalists at the 1980 Summer Olympics